AEW Homecoming is an annual professional wrestling television special produced by All Elite Wrestling (AEW). The event airs as a special episode of the company's weekly television program, Dynamite. Established by the promotion in 2020, the event's title is a reference to it being held at AEW's home base of Daily's Place in Jacksonville, Florida. Due to the COVID-19 pandemic, the vast majority of the promotion's shows had to be held at Daily's Place from March 2020 to June 2021, but these are not counted as Homecoming events due to the circumstances.

History
After All Elite Wrestling (AEW) was founded in January 2019, the company held its third-ever event, Fight for the Fallen, on July 13, 2019 at Daily's Place in Jacksonville, Florida. Daily's Place is an open-air amphitheater located on the same complex as the TIAA Bank Field, the home stadium of the Jacksonville Jaguars, a National Football League team that is also owned by AEW President and Chief Executive Officer Tony Khan. As such, the stadium itself is AEW's de facto headquarters, with Daily's Place becoming AEW's home base. On January 1, 2020, AEW held a special episode of their weekly television program, Dynamite, at Daily's Place titled Homecoming, in reference to the venue. 

Due to the COVID-19 pandemic that began effecting the industry in mid-March 2020, AEW held the majority of their programs from Daily's Place; these events were originally held without fans, but the company began running shows at 10–15% capacity in August, before eventually running full capacity shows in May 2021. Although held at Daily's Place, these shows were not "Homecoming" events due to the circumstances. In May, AEW announced that they would be returning to live touring, beginning with a special episode of Dynamite titled Road Rager on July 7. Road Rager was also the first of a four-week span of special Dynamite episodes as part of AEW's "Welcome Back" tour, which continued with the two-part Fyter Fest on July 14 and 21 and concluded with Fight for the Fallen on July 28. In early July, AEW scheduled a second Homecoming episode to be held after the conclusion of the "Welcome Back" tour, briefly returning AEW to Daily's Place on August 4. The event was promoted as the final event to be held at Daily's Place for Summer 2021.

Events

See also
List of AEW Dynamite special episodes
List of AEW pay-per-view events

References

External links

 
Recurring events established in 2020